Dalmazzo is a surname. Notable people with the surname include:

Maria Dalmazzo (born 1983), Colombian actress
Nicola Dalmazzo (died 1653), Roman Catholic prelate
Renzo Dalmazzo (1886–1959), Italian lieutenant general

Italian-language surnames